Josuah Turner (1884 – 1960) was an English footballer who played for Stoke.

Career
Turner was born in Tunstall, Staffordshire and played amateur football with Tunstall before joining Stoke in 1908. He played in one first team match which came in a 4–1 defeat to Aston Villa Reserves during the 1908–09 season before returning to Tunstall.

Career statistics

References

English footballers
Stoke City F.C. players
1884 births
1960 deaths
Association football defenders